This is a comprehensive list of songs by English folk singer Jack Savoretti.

Original songs
All songs written by Jack Savoretti.

Covers

Notes
  Live Performance

Unreleased songs

Savoretti, Jack